Ghulam Murtaza Satti is a Pakistani politician who has been a member of the National Assembly of Pakistan from 2002 to 2007. He have 4 daughters. The oldest is in university, the middle two are in A-levels and the youngest in O-level. His wife is a engineer who have her own company.

Political career
He was elected nazim of the Narrh union council in Kahuta Tehsil in 2000 as a candidate of Pakistan Muslim League (Q).

He was elected to the National Assembly of Pakistan from Constituency NA-50 (Rawalpindi-I) as a candidate of Pakistan Peoples Party (PPP) in 2002 Pakistani general election. He defeated Shahid Khaqan Abbasi.

He ran for the seat of the National Assembly from Constituency NA-50 (Rawalpindi-I) as a candidate of PPP in 2008 Pakistani general election, but was unsuccessful. He received 77978 votes and lost the seat to Shahid Khaqan Abbasi.

He ran for the seat of the National Assembly from Constituency NA-50 (Rawalpindi-I) as a candidate of PPP in 2013 Pakistani general election, but was unsuccessful. He received 45203 votes and lost the seat to Shahid Khaqan Abbasi.

He joined Pakistan Tehreek-e-Insaf in 2017.
He ran for the seat of the Punjab Assembly from Constituency PP-07 as a candidate of PTI in 2018 Pakistani general election, but was unsuccessful. He received 40528 votes and lost the seat to Raja Sagheer Ahmed

References

Living people
Pakistan People's Party MNAs
Pakistani MNAs 2002–2007
Year of birth missing (living people)